Sam Wasson is an American author and publisher, who often writes about the history of cinema in Hollywood. His works include the biography Fosse, the history books Improv Nation: How We Made a Great American Art and The Big Goodbye: Chinatown and the Last Years of Hollywood and the co-authored Hollywood: The Oral History.

Early life and education

Wasson was born in Los Angeles, America. His maternal grandfather was former Variety executive, Hal “Lew” Scott. Wasson attended Wesleyan University, and USC School of Cinematic Arts.

Career
During the writing of a biography about Bob Fosse (titled Fosse) researcher Jane Klein and Wasson unearthed lost footage of Fosse's 1961 ABC television show "Seasons of Youth”. In 2014, Fosse was one of six books shortlisted for the $10,000 Marfield Prize and received the Special Jury Prize at the George Freedley Memorial Award. Production rights for a limited television series based on the book were purchased by television channel FX in 2018.

In 2020, Wasson published a book about the making of the 1974 movie Chinatown, titled The Big Goodbye. Later that year, a film adaptation of The Big Goodbye was announced, with Lorne Michaels attached as producer and Ben Affleck as director. Also in 2020, Wasson co-founded a publishing house with producer Brandon Millan.

Wasson was a visiting professor at Wesleyan University and Emerson College.

In 2021, Wasson and William Rempel filed a lawsuit to unseal a 2010 deposition transcript of Roger Gunson, a former deputy district attorney, in relation to the Roman Polanski sexual abuse case. In July 2022, the court ruled for the transcripts to be unsealed.

In 2022, Wasson and Jeanine Basinger wrote an oral history book titled Hollywood: The Oral History.

Bibliography

Books

References

External links
 
 

1981 births
21st-century American Jews
21st-century American male writers
21st-century American non-fiction writers
American film historians
Harvard-Westlake School alumni
Historians from California
Jewish American writers
Living people
University of Southern California alumni
Wesleyan University alumni
Writers from Los Angeles